The Occupational Cancer Convention is  an International Labour Organization Convention on workplace safety standards against occupational cancer, established in 1974 during the 59th session of the Interlnational Labour Conference. The convention entered into force in 1976 after ratification of Ecuador and Hungary. The convention has been ratified by 41 countries.

References

External links 
Text and Ratifications.

Cancer
International Labour Organization conventions
Occupational safety and health treaties
Treaties concluded in 1974
Treaties entered into force in 1976
Treaties of the Democratic Republic of Afghanistan
Treaties of Czechoslovakia
Treaties of Yugoslavia
Treaties of the Czech Republic
Treaties of Serbia and Montenegro
Treaties of Argentina
Treaties of Belgium
Treaties of Bosnia and Herzegovina
Treaties of Brazil
Treaties of Croatia
Treaties of Denmark
Treaties of Ecuador
Treaties of Egypt
Treaties of Finland
Treaties of France
Treaties of West Germany
Treaties of Guinea
Treaties of Guyana
Treaties of the Hungarian People's Republic
Treaties of Iceland
Treaties of Ba'athist Iraq
Treaties of Ireland
Treaties of Italy
Treaties of Japan
Treaties of South Korea
Treaties of Lebanon
Treaties of Luxembourg
Treaties of Montenegro
Treaties of the Netherlands
Treaties of Nicaragua
Treaties of Norway
Treaties of Peru
Treaties of Portugal
Treaties of Russia
Treaties of Slovakia
Treaties of Slovenia
Treaties of Sweden
Treaties of Switzerland
Treaties of Syria
Treaties of Ukraine
Treaties of Uruguay
Treaties of Venezuela
Treaties of North Macedonia
Health treaties
1974 in labor relations